Kean may refer to:
 Kean (name)
 Kean (play), 1838 play by Alexandre Dumas père based on the life of the actor Edmund Kean, and its adaptations:
 Kean (1921 film), a German silent historical film
 Kean (1924 film), a silent film directed by Alexandre Volkoff
 Kean (1940 film), an Italian historical drama film
 Kean, 1953 stage adaption by Jean-Paul Sartre
 Kean: Genius or Scoundrel, 1956 Italian biographical drama film
 Kean (musical), 1961 musical by Peter Stone, Robert Wright, and George Forrest
 Kean University, university in Union, New Jersey
 Kean University-Wenzhou, satellite campus of Kean University in Zhejiang, China, the first Western university in the country
 KEAN-FM, a radio station in Abilene, Texas
 Ivanna Eudora Kean High School, high school in St. Thomas, Virgin Islands
 The Kean, apartment building in Detroit, Michigan

See also 
 Kean Commission or the 9/11 Commission
 Keane (disambiguation)
 Keen (disambiguation)
 Keene (disambiguation)